Indonesian Islamic Union Party was an Islamic political party in Indonesia before and after independence. In 1973 it was merged into the United Development Party.

The pre-independence party

Establishment and aims
The Sarekat Islam (Islamic Association) was a pre-war political organization in the then-Dutch East Indies. Following a split brought about by the increasing influence of the Indonesian Communist Party (PKI), at the organization's 1923 conference, Oemar Said Tjokroaminoto and Agus Salim set up the Islamic Union Party to rid the organization of the PKI. The PSII supported Sukarno's efforts to unite Indonesian political organizations following the establishment of the Indonesian National Party (PNI) in 1927. The PSI changed its name to the Indonesian Islamic Union Party (PSII) in 1929.

At the 1930 party congress held in Yogyakarta, the party outlined its six key principles, namely:
 Unity of the Islamic community (ummah) based on Al Imran verse 102 in the Quran
 Independence of the Ummah in their own country
 Democratic national governance in line with [Ash-Shura]] verse 38 in the Quran
 Prosperity of the people brought about by state-owned companies overseen by the people in line with Islamic principles
 Equality in life and before the law in line with [Al-Hujuraat]] verse 13 in the Quran
 Real Islamic-based independence on the principles of equality and brotherhood

Splits in the party
Following allegations of misusing party funds, in 1933 Soekiman Wirjosandjojo and Soerjopranoto, both senior party figures, were expelled from the PSII. Along with other PSII dissidents, Soekiman formed the  Indonesian Islamic Political Party (Parii), and in 1938, after a failed reconciliation with the PSII, the Indonesian Islamic Party.
Meanwhile, the fortunes of the PSII waned in 1934 when the Dutch colonial authorities clamped down on nationalist activities and party leader Tjokroaminoto died. Following this, Abikusno Tjokrosujoso (Tjokroaminoto's younger brother) and S. M. Kartosuwiryo took control of the party. Agus Salim was expelled, and the party began to take a much tougher anti-colonial stance.

The PSSI in alliances
In September 1937, the Supreme Islamic Council of Indonesia, a grouping of Muslim organisations including the PSII, was formed by Mas Mansoer, Ahmad Dahlan and Abdul Wahab Hasbullah. Established to discuss religious matters, pressure from the PSII and the Indonesian Islamic Party at the 1938 conference resulted in it becoming more political in nature. Also in 1938, following discussions between PSSI chairman Abikusno Tjokrosujoso and Soetomo, the leader of the nationalist party Parindra, the PSII tried to establish an organisation to unite the nationalist movement by inviting delegates from Parindra and two other organisations, Gerindo and Paguyuban Pasundan to a meeting in March. This resulted in the establishment of the Mediating Body for Indonesian Political Parties (Bapeppi), but as neither Gerindo nor Paguyuban Pasundan were prepared to join it, it achieved nothing. Later that same year, Mohammad Husni Thamrin from Parindra took the initiative, and was largely responsible for the formation of the Indonesian Political Federation (GAPI), which brought together all the nationalist inorganizations except the PNI. It included organisations that had take a more cooperative stance with the colonial government by agreeing to take seats in the Volksraad quasi-legislature, as well as those that were non-cooperative, such as the PSSI.

Within GAPI, the PSSI was uninterested in international affairs, unlike some other members of the organisation. Within GAPI, it was the foremost campaigner for GAPI's 1939 call for an Indonesian parliament, which Abikusno Tjokrosujoso said had first been demanded by the Sarekat Islam under Tjokroaminoto. Despite the PSSI's dislike of working with  the "cooperating" parties within GAPI, the party explained that support for a parliament was not a softening of its non-cooperative stance: the party would cooperate with the Dutch only after a parliament had been established. On 12 December 1942, after the outbreak of War with Japan, GAPI and the executive of the  Indonesian People's Council (MRI), an organisation comprising GAPI, the MIAI and the PVPN civil service union released a statement calling for the Indonesian population to cooperate with and obey the Dutch colonial to defend peace and maintain order. Although this led to government finally agreeing to hold talks because Abikusno Tjokrosujoso, a member of he MRI executive, had not been consulted in advance, the PSII withdrew from GAPI and along with the MIAI also left the MRI. In 1942 the occupying Japanese banned all political activity. Rather than working with the MIAI, in 1943 the Japanese established an organization called Masyumi in an attempt to control Islam in Indonesia.

Post-independence

Revival of the party
After the 17 August 1945 Indonesian Declaration of Independence, at the end of October, the Working Committee of the Central Indonesian National Committee, the acting legislature, called for political parties to be formed. A new organization, also called Masyumi, was formed on 7 November. It comprised all the members of the wartime Masyumi, including the PSII.

In July 1947, the PSII, which had never ceased to be a distinct organization, split from Masyumi, ostensibly because of disagreements with the leadership, especially with Natsir. However, Masyumi and other politicians of the time took the view that the main reason for reestablishing the party was to obtain seats in the new cabinet as other main parties had rejected Masyumi's demands to be given a dominant role in it - including the position of prime minister. In return for support for the cabinet from an Islamic party, the PSII was given fiveseats in the new cabinet formed by Amir Sjarifuddin which took office on 3 July. The new PSII, led by Wondoamiseno and Arudji Kartawinata claimed to be same organization as the pre-war party. It did not cooperate with Masyumi after the split although leaders of both parties claimed their differences were minor, and was not as strong as Masyumi nationally.

The PSII in cabinet and parliament
After Amir Sjarifuddin reshuffled the cabinet in November 1947, in the new lineup, the PSII was given five seats, including deputy prime minister. When this cabinet collapsed on 23 January 1948, the PSSI did not sit in any cabinets for more than two years. Following the reestablishment of the Indonesian unitary state after the dissolution of the United States of Indonesia in 1950, the PSII was given four seats in the Provisional People's Representative Council and chairman of the Masyumi executive council Mohammad Natsir appointed one PSSI member, Harsono Tjokroaminoto to his cabinet, which took office on 6 September. However, Harsono resigned on 31 December shortly after the PSII had voted against a parliamentary motion of confidence in the cabinet. Haroso's brother, Anwar Tjokroaminoto was the only PSSI member in the Wilopo Cabinet, serving as social affairs minister from April 1952 until he resigned in May 1953.

The party came fifth in the 1955 legislative election with 2.9 percent of the vote, winning eight seats in the People's Representative Council. In the 1971 election it won 2.4 percent of the vote and ten seats, but shortly after was forced to fuse into the United Development Party, ending its existence as a separate political entity.

Post-Suharto revival
After the forced merger of the parties, the PSII became a mass nonpolitical organization called Syarekat Islam. Following the fall of Suharto, on 29 May 1998 the PSII was revived with Taufiq Rusjdi Tjokroaminoto, grandson of Oemar Said Tjokroaminoto, as chairman. In the 1999 election it received less than 0.5% of the vote, winning one seat in the legisalture, held by Amaruddin Djajasubita, representing Tasikmalaya. Party chair Taufiq Rusjdi Tjokroaminoto died in February 2001 and the party was subsequently dissolved according to the 2002 Political Parties Law.

See also

Politics of Indonesia
List of political parties in Indonesia

References

Notes

1923 establishments in the Dutch East Indies
1947 establishments in Indonesia
1973 disestablishments in Indonesia
Defunct political parties in Indonesia
Islamic political parties in Indonesia
Political parties disestablished in 1973
Political parties established in 1923
Political parties established in 1947
United Development Party